1898 was the ninth season of County Championship cricket in England. Yorkshire won the championship for the second time in three years. It was an emphatic victory with a record of sixteen wins and seven draws in 26 games. Middlesex finished second after two wins over Kent in late August to improve five places on their 1897 finish. Derbyshire broke their streak of 22 Championship matches without victory by beating Hampshire in late May. As for individual performances, Surrey batsman Bobby Abel made 1800 runs for the second season in succession, one run shy of his own championship record in 1897.

Honours
County Championship – Yorkshire
Minor Counties Championship – Worcestershire
Wisden (Five Cricketers of the Year) – Wilfred Rhodes, Bill Storer, Charlie Townsend, Albert Trott, William Lockwood

County Championship

Final table 

 1 Games completed

Points system:

 1 for a win
 0 for a draw, a tie or an abandoned match
 -1 for a loss

Most runs in the County Championship

Most wickets in the County Championship

Overall first-class statistics

Leading batsmen

Leading bowlers

References

Annual reviews
 James Lillywhite's Cricketers' Annual (Red Lilly), Lillywhite, 1899
 Wisden Cricketers' Almanack 1899

External links
 Cricket in England in 1898

1898 in English cricket
1898